The UEFA Women's Euro 2013 qualifying – Group 6 was contested by five teams competing for one automatic spot in the final tournament. The numbers 2 from all the groups were ranked with the best also automatically qualifying. While the others entered play-offs. Netherlands ranked top of the numbers 2 and also qualified for the final tournament straight out of the group.

Standings

Fixtures
All times are UTC+2.

Goalscorers
8 goals
 Manon Melis

4 goals
 Danka Podovac

3 goals

 Steph Houghton
 Jill Scott
 Ellen White
 Rachel Williams
 Rachel Yankey
 Kirsten van de Ven
 Marija Radojičić
 Vesna Smiljković

2 goals

 Katarina Kolar
 Jessica Clarke
 Chantal de Ridder
 Jovana Sretenović

1 goal

 Petra Glavać
 Dušanka Juko
 Izabela Lojna
 Martina Šalek
 Eniola Aluko
 Karen Carney
 Casey Stoney
 Rachel Unitt
 Maayke Heuver
 Anouk Hoogendijk
 Lieke Martens
 Sylvia Smit
 Sherida Spitse
 Daniëlle van de Donk
 Mandy van den Berg
 Marina Nešić
 Milena Pešić
 Violeta Slović
 Kaja Eržen
 Tanja Vrabel
 Urška Žganec
 Mateja Zver

1 own goal
 Allison Scurich (playing against Slovenia)
 Violeta Slović (playing against England)
 Lidija Stojkanović (playing against Slovenia)

References
Group 6

6
2011–12 in English women's football
2012–13 in English women's football
2011–12 in Croatian football
2012–13 in Croatian football
2011–12 in Slovenian football
2012–13 in Slovenian football
2011–12 in Serbian football
2012–13 in Serbian football
2011–12 in Dutch women's football
2012–13 in Dutch women's football
Qual
Qual